Saw B San thein Myint (born 30 June 1963) is a Burmese politician who currently serves as an Amyotha Hluttaw MP for Kayin State № 8 Constituency. He is a member of National League for Democracy.

Early life and education
Saw was born on 30 June 1963 in Kawkareik Township, Kayin State, Myanmar. He is an ethnic Karen. His previous job is farmer. He had served as the executive member of NLD township.

Political career
He is a member of the National League for Democracy. In the 2015 Myanmar general election, he was elected as an Amyotha Hluttaw MP, winning a majority of 13624 votes and elected representative from Kayin State № 8 parliamentary constituency. He also serves as the member of Amyotha Hluttaw's Ethnic Affairs Committee.

References

National League for Democracy politicians
1963 births
Living people
People from Kayin State
Burmese people of Karen descent